The Chief Happiness Officer (CHO) in a company is the manager of workers' happiness. Probably originating in North America, CHO posts are being created in European and UK companies to ensure workers' welfare needs are met.

In popular culture 
In the tabletop role-playing game Paranoia (1984), characters may have to accomplish “Mandatory Bonus Fun Duties” (first presented in the supplement Acute Paranoia, first published in 1986), one of which is Happiness Officer. Their job is to ensure that people under their care are happy. In the dystopia of the game, being happy is mandatory and punishable by law. So the Happiness Officer will use any tool he can to ensure everybody is happy, from singing in choir for better morale up to heavy medications to maintain artificial — but mandatory — happiness.

References

Business occupations
Work–life balance